Mansion Group is an online gaming company founded in 2004. They currently operate two customer-facing online casino platforms: MansionCasino and Casino.com. Mansion Group is headquartered (and licensed) in Gibraltar and licensed in Ireland, and Italy, with hubs in Bulgaria and Spain.

History 
Mansion Group was founded in 2004 and followed in the same year by the launch of the first of three customer-facing brands, MansionCasino - an online gambling website offering static and live casino-style games.

One of Mansion Group's first publicity pushes was becoming the official shirt sponsor for Tottenham Hotspur F.C. in May 2006. This would signify the first in a series of football club sponsorships.

In the following year, 2007, Mansion Group launched Casino.com. After acquiring the domain, they developed a new site aimed at offering an online casino gaming experience. This popular site is still in operation today and was awarded the International Gaming Award for ‘Best Customer Service Company of the Year’.

In 2011, Mansion Group entered a partnership with the FA Cup holders at the time, Manchester City Football Club, to become their international betting partner. The move was tendered by SportsQuake - a marketing agency specialising in the world of sports. This venture represented a range of commercial opportunities - including expansion into the Asian Market for the Manchester City brand - and was purported to be a deal with multiple millions of pounds.

By 2013, Mansion Group sought to expand its customer base for the Casino.com brand through a television advert. The advert played off the brand's domain name being an obvious destination for those looking for online gaming through the use of absurd scenarios, e.g. a person looking for a new suit wouldn't go to a fancy dress shop - so if someone wanted to play online casino games, why would they go anywhere but casino.com?

European expansion continued with the opening of the Technology and Operations Centre in Sofia, Bulgaria in 2014, where a significant portion of its operations are managed, split with Gibraltar. In 2015, they attained a Remote Gambling Software licence from the UK Gambling Commission (UKGC). The CEO at the time, Sagi Lahav, called it ‘an important milestone in [their] strategy of acquiring gaming licences in key markets for the company.’

2015 was marked with two more notable sponsorship milestones as Mansion Group began a shirt sponsorship with both AFC Bournemouth and Crystal Palace F.C. - just in time for the 2015-2016 Premier League.

In 2017, Mansion Group was awarded the first Playtech award in recognition for ‘marketing excellence and innovation’ - largely due to their use of business intelligence (BI) to provide a personalised gaming experience.

AFC Bournemouth's partnership with Mansion Group continued with the signing of a two-year sponsorship deal, including new shirt designs, pitchside branding. Notably, Mansion Group also focussed marketing activity in the Asian market in an effort to expand the club's reach and profile in this region.

2018 was an industrious year for Mansion Group. They launched MansionBet, a gaming website focussing on sports betting. Mansion Group secured an Irish betting licence for MansionBet and revealed plans to secure the same for Mansion Casino and Casino.com.

Mansion Group also enjoyed notable award success in 2018, with The International Gaming Awards (IGA) recognising Mansion Group as casino operator of the year and the CFI awarding Mansion Group the title of Most Responsible Online Gambling Operator (Global).

Newcastle United F.C. became another football team to partner with Mansion Group as a betting partner, through the new MansionBet brand. The 2019 deal also saw betting terminals installed at St James’ Park for two seasons, and the brand offered football fans a range of gaming-related deals, offers and experiences. Dale Aitchison, head of commercial at Newcastle United, noted Mansion Group's “proven track record when it comes to football sponsorship”.

In 2020, the IGA awarded Mansion Group another prestigious award that represented a commitment to transparency and dedication to providing its customers with a great experience - the Best Customer Service Award.

Closing MansionBet Sports Brand 
In March 2022, Mansion Group made the decision to close MansionBet sports betting brand. This move represented a refocussing of goals and assets onto expanding their casino brands, MansionCasino and Casino.com.

This refocussing began in 2021, with MansionCasino brand obtaining a Spanish operating license, and continued in late 2022 after MansionBet's closure with Mansion Group obtaining an Ontario Gaming License.

Controversies and Penalties 
In 2022, an online casino operator owned by Mansion Group, Onisac ltd, encountered a penalty fine of £850,000 ($1.14 million) for failing to follow anti-money-laundering (AML) regulations.

The fine, issued by the Gibraltar Gaming Commissioner, came after a routine investigation into standards discovered that Onisac Ltd had failed, in some areas, to follow established protocols for managing its player base from outside the European Union and outside the UK.

Compounding this discovery, Onisac ltd was also said to have failed to respond appropriately to previous deficiencies, with an inadequate plan to counter them in future.

Brands

MansionCasino 
MansionCasino is an online casino-style gambling site operated by Mansion Group and based in Gibraltar. It was officially launched in 2004.

MansionCasino launched in Spain in 2021, achieving a licence with Dirrecion General de Ordenacion del Juego (DGOJ).

Casino.com 
Casino.com was launched in 2007 and is Mansion Group's second online gaming brand with a casino style. It offers live casino-style gaming experiences and other table gaming-style games. It is based in Gibraltar.

References 

Companies established in 2004